This is a list of rivers in Lesotho. This list is arranged by drainage basin, with respective tributaries indented under each larger stream's name.

Orange River (Senqu River)
Caledon River (Mohokare River)
Little Caledon River
Ngoe River
Tele River
Makhaleng River
Senqunyane River
Mantsonyane River
Tsedike River
Malibamat'so River
Pelaneng River
Dinakeng River
Khubelu River
Mokhotlong River

References
U.S. Central Intelligence Agency 1990
GEOnet Names Server

Lesotho
Rivers